Devils Fork State Park is in northwestern South Carolina on the eastern edge of the Sumter National Forest at the edge of 7,500-acre (3,035 ha) Lake Jocassee. It is located three miles (5 km) off SC 11, the Cherokee Scenic Highway, near the town of Salem, South Carolina.

The park offers hiking, camping (including several paddle-in primitive sites), canoeing and kayaking.  The park is well known for rainbow and brown trout, as well as largemouth, smallmouth, and white bass, crappie, bream and catfish.  The park has accommodations for scuba divers, including a walk-in ramp; thirty foot visibility is common, and due to the lake's recent creation, roads, houses, signs and other marks of human habitation can be seen on the lake bottom.

The  park was created in 1990. The park has many small waterfalls that feed lake Jocassee, and is home to the Oconee Bell, a wildflower indigenous to North and South Carolina that grows throughout the park; more than 90 percent of the world population of these delicate white and pink flowers is found in the park.

References

External links
Official website
Devils Fork State Park Pictures & Map

State parks of South Carolina
State parks of the Appalachians
Protected areas of Oconee County, South Carolina